The 2017–18 Czech Extraliga season was the 25th season of the Czech Extraliga since its creation after the breakup of Czechoslovakia and the Czechoslovak First Ice Hockey League in 1993.

Regular season

CHL Qualification to Champions Hockey League

Scoring leaders 
 
List shows the ten best skaters based on the number of points during the regular season. If two or more skaters are tied (i.e. same number of points, goals and played games), all of the tied skaters are shown.

GP = Games played; G = Goals; A = Assists; Pts = Points; +/– = Plus/minus; PIM = Penalty minutes

Leading goaltenders 
These are the leaders in GAA among goaltenders who played at least 40% of the team's minutes. The table is sorted by GAA, and the criteria for inclusion are bolded.

GP = Games played; TOI = Time on ice (minutes); GA = Goals against; SO = Shutouts; Sv% = Save percentage; GAA = Goals against average

Playoffs
Ten teams qualify for the playoffs. Teams 1–6 have a bye to the quarterfinals, while teams 7–10 meet each other in a preliminary playoff round.

Playoff bracket 
In the first round the 7th-ranked team will meet the 10th-ranked team and the 8th-ranked team will meet the 9th-ranked team for a place in the second round. In the second round, the top-ranked team will meet the lowest-ranked winner of the first round, the 2nd-ranked team will face the other winner of the first round, the 3rd-ranked team will face the 6th-ranked team, and the 4th-ranked team will face the 5th-ranked team. In the third round, the highest remaining seed is matched against the lowest remaining seed. In each round the higher-seeded team is awarded home advantage. In the first round the meetings are played as best-of-five series and the rest is best-of-seven series that follows an alternating home team format: the higher-seeded team will play at home for games 1 and 2 (plus 5 and 7 if necessary), and the lower-seeded team will be at home for game 3 and 4 (plus 6 if necessary).

Play-off final: HC Oceláři Třinec - HC Kometa Brno 1:4 (5:1, 2:3, 2:3, 2:5, 1:4). HC Kometa Brno has won its second Czech league title (and 13th overall title).

Relegation

References

External links 
 
 oddsportal.com
 eliteprospects.com

Czech
2017–18 in Czech ice hockey leagues
Czech Extraliga seasons